A. nigricans may refer to:
 Acacia nigricans, a wattle species endemic to an area on the south coast of Western Australia
 Acanthurus nigricans, a tang fish species from the Eastern Indian Ocean
 Acronicta nigricans, a moth species found in western China
 Aspideretes nigricans, the black soft-shelled turtle or Bostami turtle, a freshwater turtle species found in India and Bangladesh
 Avrainvillea nigricans, an algae species in the genus Avrainvillea

Synonyms
 Australorbis nigricans, a synonym for Biomphalaria tenagophila, an air-breathing freshwater snail species

See also
 Nigricans (disambiguation)